The Crusade is the third studio album by American heavy metal band Trivium. It was released on October 10, 2006, through Roadrunner Records and was produced by Jason Suecof and the band themselves. The album marked a significant musical departure from the metalcore sound of preceding album Ascendancy, with the band instead bringing their thrash metal influences to the fore. Accordingly, vocalist and guitarist Matt Heafy sings with primarily 'clean' vocals throughout The Crusade, rather than utilizing the 'screaming' style heard on Ascendancy.

The Crusade peaked at number 7 in United Kingdom and was later certified silver in for sales in excess of 60,000 copies. In the United States, the album debuted at No. 25 on the Billboard 200 albums chart on its release, selling 31,000 copies in the US in its first week. It has sold over 100,000 copies in the United States.

Background
Before the album was released, three songs from the album were released on the band's MySpace: "Detonation", "Anthem (We Are the Fire)", and "Entrance of the Conflagration". Music videos for "Entrance of the Conflagration", "Anthem (We Are the Fire)", "The Rising", "To the Rats", and "Becoming the Dragon" were produced and released on Roadrunner's website.

"Anthem (We Are the Fire)" was a hit for the band in the United Kingdom, with the track debuting at number 1 on the UK Rock & Metal Singles Chart and spending several further weeks in the top 10. As of 2019, the single is also the band's only track to break into the UK Singles Chart, peaking at number 40.

The track "Detonation" is available on the Xbox 360 release of the video game Guitar Hero II as downloadable content while the track "Anthem (We Are the Fire)" is featured on Burnout Dominator, Sleeping Dogs and Saints Row 2.

Composition

Influences, style and themes
The album represents a drastic change in style from their previous album, Ascendancy, abandoning the metalcore genre and featuring a style described generally as thrash metal and reminiscent of thrash metal band Metallica's 1980s albums, along with progressive metal and speed metal. As a result, vocalist Matt Heafy used much less screaming and more of a clean vocal style similar to James Hetfield throughout most of the record. Heafy justified this by noting that "the four of us were never into bands that scream and we don't like any of the current bands that scream, so we asked ourselves why we're doing it." Screamed vocals (along with the metalcore genre itself) would return as a regular attribute on the band's proceeding album, Shogun, although screaming can be found during some select rare moments in The Crusade, most notably in "Becoming the Dragon".

Lyrical themes on the album include famous killings. "Entrance of the Conflagration" is about Andrea Yates' murder of her five children, "Unrepentant" is about Nazir Ahmad's murder of his three daughters and stepdaughter, "Contempt Breeds Contamination" is about the death of Amadou Diallo, and "And Sadness Will Sear" is based upon the murder of Matthew Shepard. Another common theme on this album is unity or "being united" with songs like "Anthem (We Are the Fire)" and "The Rising". Another lyrical theme that is noticed is in the song "Becoming the Dragon", which is based on the Japanese mythological story of the dragon (how the koi will swim up the waterfall known as "Dragon's Gate" where it is thus transformed into the mythological beast).

Track listing
All lyrics by Matt Heafy, and all music by Heafy, except where noted.

Personnel
Trivium
Matt Heafy – lead vocals, guitars
Corey Beaulieu – guitars, backing vocals
Paolo Gregoletto – bass, backing vocals
Travis Smith – drums, percussion

Additional performers
Jason Suecof – additional lead guitar on "The Rising"

Production
Produced by Trivium and Jason Suecof
Engineered by Mark Lewis and Jason Suecof
Mixed by Colin Richardson
Mix engineer and Pro Tools – Matt Hyde
Assistant engineer – Laurence Aldridge
Mastered by Ted Jensen

Charts

References

2006 albums
Trivium (band) albums
Roadrunner Records albums
Albums produced by Jason Suecof